In functional analysis, a discipline within mathematics, the Szász–Mirakyan operators (also spelled "Mirakjan" and "Mirakian") are generalizations of Bernstein polynomials to infinite intervals, introduced by Otto Szász in 1950  and G. M. Mirakjan in 1941. They are defined by
=

Basic results

A converse of the first property was shown by Horová in 1968 (Altomare & Campiti 1994:350).

Theorem on convergence
In Szász's original paper, he proved the following:
This is analogous to a theorem stating that Bernstein polynomials approximate continuous functions on [0,1].

Generalizations
A Kantorovich-type generalization is sometimes discussed in the literature. These generalizations are also called the Szász–Mirakjan–Kantorovich operators.

In 1976, C. P. May showed that the Baskakov operators can reduce to the Szász–Mirakyan operators.

References

 (See also: Favard operators)

Footnotes

Approximation theory